Prem Singh Lalpur (1925-2011) was an Indian politician from the state of Punjab and was a three term member of the Punjab Legislative Assembly.

Constituency
Lalpur represented the Tarn Taran Assembly Constituency of Punjab.

Political Party  
Lalpur was a member of Shiromani Akali Dal.

References

External links
STATISTICAL REPORT ON GENERAL ELECTION, 1997 TO THE LEGISLATIVE ASSEMBLY OF PUNJAB

People from Amritsar
Shiromani Akali Dal politicians
Indian National Congress politicians
Punjab, India MLAs 1980–1985
Punjab, India MLAs 1985–1990
Punjab, India MLAs 1997–2002
1925 births

2011 deaths